Mael may refer to:

People
 Mael (name), a Celtic given name
 Maël (saint), fifth-century Breton saint
 Ron Mael (born 1945), American musician, member of the band Sparks
 Russell Mael (born 1948), American musician, member of the band Sparks

Fictional characters
 Mael (The Vampire Chronicles), character from Anne Rice's The Vampire Chronicles series
 Mael, sea god in Steven Erikson's Malazan Book of the Fallen series
 Mael, fallen Archangel from the The Seven Deadly Sins (manga)

Other
 Mæl Station, a railway terminus in Telemark, Norway
 Maël-Carhaix, a commune in Brittany, France